Kate Latham (born October 25, 1952) is an American former professional tennis player. She competed in Grand Slam tournaments from 1973 to 1984.

References

External links
 
 

1952 births
Living people
American female tennis players
Place of birth missing (living people)
Tennis players from San Francisco
21st-century American women